The Arabic-language reform journal at-Tahdhib (Arabic: تهذيب; DMG: at-Tahḏīb; English: "Edification") was published in Cairo from 1901 to 1903 in a total of 33 issues. It was published monthly during the first year and afterwards three times per month. It is probably the oldest extant Jewish magazine in Arabic language. Its founder, editor, and principal author, the Egyptian Karaite Jewish lawyer Murād Farag (Faraj) (1866-1956), used the magazine as a platform for changes in Egypt's Karaite Jewish community, the magazine's target group. The content of the magazine focused on identity and cultural orientation as well as legal and educational reforms. It was multifaceted and contained essays on moral behavior and proposed solutions as well as legal matters such as inheritance, consanguinity, circumcision and Jewish dietary laws (kashrut).

References

External links

1901 establishments in Egypt
1903 disestablishments in Egypt
Arabic-language magazines
Defunct literary magazines published in Egypt
Jewish magazines
Magazines established in 1901
Magazines disestablished in 1903
Magazines published in Cairo
Monthly magazines published in Egypt